Miroslav Beznoska was a Czech fencer. He competed in the team épée event at the 1928 Summer Olympics.

References

External links
 

Year of birth missing
Year of death missing
Czech male fencers
Czechoslovak male fencers
Olympic fencers of Czechoslovakia
Fencers at the 1928 Summer Olympics